Grailly is a noble family from the Pays de Gex, which rose in the southern French nobility through marriage. The family originated from Lake Geneva in the County of Savoy. Jean I de Grailly presumably was part of Peter II of Savoy entourage, whose niece married King Henry III of England. Jean would gain royal favour from King Edward I England and would receive the viscounty of Benauges. Later generations would gain among others, the County of Foix, the Duchy of Nemours, and the Kingdom of Navarre.

 
Counts of Foix
Grailly
Navarre
Roman Catholic monarchs